Crassula aequilatera, known as the triangle shell, is a surf clam, a moderately large marine bivalve mollusc in the family Mactridae.

Distribution
This marine species is endemic to New Zealand.

References

 Huber, M. (2010). Compendium of bivalves. A full-color guide to 3,300 of the world's marine bivalves. A status on Bivalvia after 250 years of research. Hackenheim: ConchBooks. 901 pp., 1 CD-ROM.
 Powell A. W. B., William Collins Publishers Ltd, Auckland 1979

External links
 Reeve, L. A. (1854). Monograph of the genus Mactra. In: Conchologia Iconica, or, illustrations of the shells of molluscous animals, vol. 8, pl. 1-21 and unpaginated text. L. Reeve & Co., London.
 Deshayes, G. P. (1854). Descriptions of fourteen new species of Mactra, in the collection of Mr. Cuming. Proceedings of the Zoological Society of London. (1853) 21: 14-17
 Beu A.G. (2004) Marine Mollusca of oxygen isotope stages of the last 2 million years in New Zealand. Part 1: Revised generic positions and recognition of warm-water and cool-water migrants. Journal of the Royal Society of New Zealand 34(2): 111-265

Mactridae
Bivalves of New Zealand
Bivalves described in 1854